Aviation American Gin, also known as Aviation Gin, is a brand of gin first produced in Portland, Oregon, by founders Christian Krogstad and Ryan Magarian in 2006. It is referred to by some as an "American dry gin" and is produced by House Spirits Distillery. Its distribution is nationwide in the United States and 15 other countries, including Canada, Spain, the UK, Ireland, France, Russia, Italy, Germany, the Netherlands, and Australia. Originally it was bottled in a wine bottle with a blue label. The newer bottle, introduced in 2013, looks like a flask and is reminiscent of the Art Deco period, with a black label and a silver cap.

History
House Spirits Distillery sold the Aviation American Gin brand to New York-based distributor Davos Brands, LLC, in 2016, but as of early 2018, it continues to be distilled in Portland by House Spirits.  As of late 2016, Aviation Gin accounted for around 40 percent of House Spirits' production.

Actor Ryan Reynolds acquired a stake in the brand from Davos in February 2018.

On August 17, 2020, Aviation was sold to Diageo, whose liquor lineup includes the gin Tanqueray, as well as Smirnoff vodka, and Johnnie Walker Scotch whisky. Reynolds still maintains an "ongoing ownership interest" in Aviation. Reynolds promotes the gin in various films he stars in, including Deadpool 2.

Distillation
Seven flavoring ingredients are used in its production: juniper, lavender, sweet and bitter orange peel, cardamom, coriander, Indian sarsaparilla, and anise seed, which are steeped in grain spirit for 48 hours, then re-distilled in a custom-built, 400-gallon pot still.  Off the still, Aviation is about 140 U.S. proof, and deionized Cascade mountain (Tap) water brings it down to 84 proof before bottling.

Awards and reviews
Wine Enthusiast magazine awarded Aviation American Gin a 97-point rating in 2012, the highest rating the magazine has given to any gin.

References

External links

Diageo brands
Gins
American brands
2006 establishments in Oregon
Aviation mass media